Fitchia tahitensis is a species of flowering plant in the family Asteraceae. It is found only in French Polynesia.

References

tahitensis
Flora of the Society Islands
Flora of French Polynesia
Taxonomy articles created by Polbot
Plants described in 1873